Daniele Negroni (born 31 July 1995) is a German-Italian singer and television personality, known for being the runner-up in season 9 of Deutschland sucht den Superstar and the twelfth season of Ich bin ein Star – Holt mich hier raus!.

Early life
Negroni was born in Arona, Italy, and currently resides in Nersingen, Germany. He was recently in an apprenticeship for being a chef. He can play the drums and guitar. He is a fan of James Blunt, James Morrison and Xavier Naidoo. He plays football and is a big fan of Borussia Mönchengladbach.

DSDS
In an argument with fellow DSDS candidate Kristof Hering, Negroni called Kristof a "faggot", but apologised for it later on. He became the runner-up in season 9 of DSDS.

Performances

Post-DSDS

Negroni's debut album did better than the debut album of Luca Hänni; who won season 9 of DSDS.

Discography

Studio albums

Singles

Other charted songs

References 

1995 births
People from Arona, Piedmont
People from Regensburg
German people of Italian descent
Italian people of German descent
Deutschland sucht den Superstar participants
Living people
19 Recordings artists
21st-century German  male singers
Ich bin ein Star – Holt mich hier raus! participants